Central Institute of Brackishwater Aquaculture (CIBA) is one of the research institutes under Indian Council of Agricultural Research (ICAR), New Delhi to serve as the nodal agency for catering to the needs of the brackishwater aquaculture research in India. The institute is headquartered at Santhome High Road, Raja Annamalai Puram, Chennai with a research centre at Kakdwip in West Bengal and an experimental field station at Muttukadu, roughly 30 km to the south of Chennai. The institute works under the Ministry of Agriculture, India.

Service profile 
The Central Institute of Brackishwater Aquaculture assists small aqua farmers in optimising their finfish and shrimp farming by providing suitable modern technologies. They also offer study courses and research facilities for students, farmers and entrepreneurs. CIBA regularly conducts farmers’ meet, trainings, exhibitions, workshops, and brainstorming sessions.

Mandate of CIBA 
CIBA was formed, under Indian Council of Agricultural Research, with a mandate to:

 conduct research for development of techno-economically viable and sustainable culture systems for finfish and shellfish in brackish water. 
 act as a repository of information on brackish water fishery resources with a systematic database 
 undertake transfer of technology through training, education and extension programmes
 provide consultancy services

Divisions 
The organization has the following research divisions for the development of marine science

Crustacean Culture Division (CCD)
The Division deals with research on crustaceans such as:
 Maturation and seed production
 Nursery rearing and culture
 Area development and impact assessment 
 Molecular approach in disease diagnostics and species identification

Finfish Culture Division (FCD)
FCD deals with brackish water fish such as Asian Seabass, Mullets, King fish and Milk fish with special emphasis on domestication, production under controlled conditions, spawning, breeding, maturation and broodstock management.

Nutrition, Genetics and Biotechnology Division (NGBD)
The principal focus of NGBD is fish feed development such as Crab feed, Seabass feed, Shrimp feed, Fish meal & fish oil replacement. The Division also conducts research on Genetics and Biotechnology.

Aquatic Animal Health and Environment Division (AAHED)
One of the 2005-07 studies estimated the national loss of shrimp production at 48717 metric tonnes of product and the economic loss due to diseases at Rs. 1022.13 crore per year. AAHED focusses on research to eliminate/minimise the aquatic health concerns due to Viral and bacterial diseases.

Social Sciences Division (SSD)
SSD conducts statistical research on:
 Sector analysis
 Extension, stakeholder interaction and requirement analysis
 Fish availability and livelihood analysis, motivating and facilitating factors and time management.

Kakdwip Research Centre (KRC)
KRC deals with research on shrimp farming in the coastal West Bengal. The Division emphasises the development of various shrimp varieties such as Mugil cephalus, L. tade, L. parsia and P. monodon in one trial and finfish such as Chanos chanos. They have a mechanism to collect extensive data from 400 brackish water aquaculture farms in the coastal districts of West Bengal and maintain a user-friendly relational database management system (RDMS) for the traditional brackish water aquaculture system in West Bengal.

Facilities

Agricultural Knowledge Management Unit (AKMU)
The Agricultural Knowledge Management Unit (AKMU) is the online connectivity platform for different research institutes, national centers and State Agricultural Universities. The also maintain databases on coastal aquaculture, provides advanced methods of communication and internet technologies and maintain and update the institute's web site.

Library
The institute has an extensive library on various disciplines of aquaculture and fisheries such as shrimp and fish grow-out culture technology, hatchery technology, physiology, nutrition, biotechnology, genetics, pathology, aquaculture engineering, pollution, toxicology, socio-economics and extension.

Laboratories
The institute has three laboratories:
 Health laboratory
 Nutrition laboratory
 KRC laboratory

Other facilities
CIBA also maintain other facilities such as Hatchery, Trainees' Hostel, Auditorium and Conference hall with video conferencing.

Patents
Dr.K.K.Krishnani, Renowned Scientist in Aquatic Animal Health and Environment Division has invented many technologies and applied for 9 patents, being the most number of applications filed by any individual scientist at CIBA.

References

External links 
 https://www.researchgate.net/institution/Central_Institute_of_Brackishwater_Aquaculture
 CIBA profile and programs on YouTube
 Documentary about CIBA on YouTube
 Location map on Open street Map
 Reference on ASTI
 on Wikimapia
 Profile

Further reading 
 ICAR booklet on CIBA
 CIBA prodile on Docstock
 Booklet on CIBA

Indian Council of Agricultural Research
Marine biology
Research institutes in Chennai
Fisheries and aquaculture research institutes in India
Fishing in India
Colleges affiliated to University of Madras
Research institutes established in 1987
1987 establishments in Tamil Nadu